Lazaros Rota (born 23 August 1997) is a Greek professional footballer who plays as a right-back for Super League club AEK Athens and the Greece national team.

Club career
Lazaros Rota started his career with the 2nd team of Iraklis Reserves. He continued in FK Slavoj Trebišov, a 2. Liga (Slovakia) club until he signed a professional contract with Zemplín Michalovce.

Zemplín Michalovce
Rota made his professional Fortuna Liga debut for Zemplín Michalovce against DAC Dunajská Streda on 29 July 2018. Rota had played the entirety of 1–4 away defeat.

Fortuna Sittard
Rota's move to Fortuna Sittard was announced on 31 January 2020. He signed a 3.5 year contract with the Dutch club. On August 31, the Dutch club announced that the two sides had reached a mutual consensus to terminate the contract of the international defender.

AEK Athens
On 2 September 2021, AEK Athens announced the acquisition of the 24-year-old right back, for the next three years for an undisclosed fee. On April 10, he scored an equaliser, which was later voted the best goal of matchday 28, against Aris. The following week he scored in Ioannina against the local team. His goal was again voted the best of the specific matchday.

International career
In August 2020, he had called up to the Greece national football team for the UEFA Nations League against Slovenia and Kosovo. He made his debut on 11 October 2020 in a Nations League game against Moldova.

Career statistics

Club

References

External links
 MFK Zemplín Michalovce official club profile
 
 Futbalnet profile
 

1998 births
Living people
Greek footballers
Greece international footballers
Greek expatriate footballers
Association football defenders
FK Slavoj Trebišov players
MFK Zemplín Michalovce players
Fortuna Sittard players
AEK Athens F.C. players
Slovak Super Liga players
2. Liga (Slovakia) players
Eredivisie players
Super League Greece players
Expatriate footballers in Slovakia
Greek expatriate sportspeople in Slovakia
Expatriate footballers in the Netherlands
Greek expatriate sportspeople in the Netherlands
Footballers from Katerini